Wallace Charles Winter Sr. (August 8, 1872 – May 10, 1947) was an American football player and coach.  He played tackle for Yale University from 1890 to 1892 and was selected to the 1891 College Football All-America Team.

After graduating from Yale, Winter became a competitive golfer.

Winter served as the head football coach at the University of Minnesota for the 1893 Golden Gophers season, leading the team to a 6–0 overall record including a 3–0 mark in Intercollegiate Athletic Association of the Northwest league play. He was known for working the players extremely hard, to the point that "they considered the actual games to be breathers compared to the scrimmages." but agreed to the conditions as long as he could act as the referee.

Winters's son, Wallace C. Winter Jr., was a back for the Yale football team, but quit the team to serve as an aviator in France during World War I.  The younger Winter was killed in action in March 1918 while flying behind enemy lines in Germany.  Winter had earlier been reported missing, but survived that episode to receive the Croix de Guerre in Feb 1917.

Head coaching record

References

External links
 

1872 births
1947 deaths
19th-century players of American football
All-American college football players
American football tackles
Yale Bulldogs football players